Tomoxia lineella is a species of beetle in the genus Tomoxia of the family Mordellidae. It was described by John Lawrence LeConte in 1862.

References

Beetles described in 1862
Tomoxia